Anathallis haberi is a species of orchid plant native to Costa Rica.

References 

haberi
Flora of Costa Rica